Budu (Ɨbʉdhʉ) is a Bantu language spoken by the Budu people in the Wamba Territory in the Orientale Province of the Democratic Republic of the Congo. Its orthography uses the special characters ɨ, ʉ, ɛ and ɔ, as well as modifier letters colon ꞉ and equal sign ꞊ for grammatical tone, marking past and future tense, respectively.

A variety of this language is called Matta and is spoken locally both north and south of Maboma.

Phonology

Consonants 

 [z] only occurs in the Koya dialect of Budu.
 /h/ can be heard as either a voiced [ɦ] or voiceless [h] among different speakers.
 /ɗ/ can be heard as [l] or a tap [ɾ] in free variation.

Vowels

Notes 

Nyali languages
Languages of the Democratic Republic of the Congo